Spreadin’ Like Wildfire (see 1981 in music) was The Archers' only album released on MCA.

At the Grammy Awards of 1981, Spreadin' Like Wildfire was nominated for the Grammy Award for Best Gospel Performance, Contemporary. The Archers performed George Ratzlaff's "Everyday I've Got To Sing Some" on the Grammy Awards.

Title list 
"Spreadin' Like Wildfire" (Hal and Rachel Newman) 4:01
"I Never Knew Love" (Reba Rambo - Dony McGuire) 4:02
"Sooner of Later" (Steve Archer - Reba Rambo) 4:22
"Back in Your Arms" (Tim Archer) 4:45
"Everyday I've Got To Sing Some" (George Ratzlaff) 4:11
"Runnin' Too Long" (Tim Archer - Reba Rambo) 4:13
"Care" (Steve Archer - Dan Cutrona) 4:33
"Nothing Can Separate Us" (Reba Rambo - Dony McGuire) 4:15
"Merry-Go-Round" (Steve Archer) 5:19
"Never Say Goodbye" (Bruce Hibbard) 3:53

Personnel
 Larrie Londin and Alex Acuña - drums and percussion
 Abraham Laboriel – bass
 Shane Keister and Dony McGuire – synthesizers
 Hadley Hockensmith - electric guitars
 Bill Kenner – mandolin
 Tony Sena - electric overdubs on "Merry-Go-Round" and "Never Say Goodbye."
 Strings by the Shelly Kurland Strings: Sheldon Kurland, George Binkley, John David Boyle, Marvin D. Chantry, Roy Christensen, Conni L. Ellisor, Carl J. Gorodetzky, Lennie Haight, Dennis W. Molchan, James R. Skipper, Samuel Terranova, Gary Vanasdale
 Horns: Dennis Solee (sax solos), Buddy Skipper, George Tidwell, Roger Bissell.
 Piano and Rhodes - Dan Cutrona

Production
 Produced by Dony McGuire
 Track and vocal arrangements by Dony McGuire
 Strings and horns arranged by Buddy Skipper
 Recording and mixing engineers - Warren Peterson and George Michael Psanos
 Recorded at MCA Whitney Studios, Glendale, California
 Vocal overdubs recorded by Willie Harlan at IAM, Irvine, California
 Remixed at Sound Stage Studios, Nashville, Tennessee
 Mastered by Steve Hall at MCA Whitney Mastering Studios, Glendale, California
 Photography by Bob Duffy
 Art direction by George Osaki
 Design by Randy Moses

References 

 Archers: Cutting Edge Music Discography
 The Archers.US
 Archers.org

External links 
http://www.thebeginningsconcert.com The Beginnings Concert

The Archers (musical group) albums
1981 albums